Message to God is a single released to promote the Paradox album by the Danish progressive metal band Royal Hunt. The song "Final Lullaby" appears as a bonus track on most current editions of the album Paradox. There is an acoustic version of the song "Far Away" in the Japanese versions of this single.

Track listing
All songs written by André Andersen.
 "Message to God" (Radio Edit) – 4:40
 "The Final Lullaby" – 3:55
 "Far Away" (Acoustic) (Japanese bonus track)

Personnel
André Andersen – keyboards and guitars
D. C. Cooper – lead and backing vocals
Jacob Kjaer - guitars
Steen Mogensen – bass guitar
Allan Sorensen – drums

External links
Metal Archives page

1997 singles